Andrea Calogero Camilleri (6 September 1925 – 17 July 2019) was an Italian writer.

Biography
Originally from Porto Empedocle, Girgenti, Sicily, Camilleri began university studies in the Faculty of Literature at the University of Palermo, but did not complete his degree; during that time he published poems and short stories.

From 1948 to 1950 he studied stage and film direction at the Silvio D'Amico Academy of Dramatic Arts (Accademia Nazionale d'Arte Drammatica) and began to take on work as a director and screenwriter, directing especially plays by Pirandello and Beckett. His parents knew and reportedly were "distant friends" of Pirandello, as he relates in his essay on Pirandello, Biography of the Changed Son. His most famous works, the Montalbano series, exhibit many Pirandellian elements: for example, the wild olive tree that helps Montalbano think is on stage in his late work The Giants of the Mountain.

With RAI, Camilleri worked on several TV productions, such as Le inchieste del commissario Maigret with Gino Cervi. In 1977 he returned to the Academy of Dramatic Arts, holding the chair of Film Direction and occupying it for 20 years.

In 1978 Camilleri wrote his first novel Il Corso Delle Cose ("The Way Things Go"). This was followed by Un Filo di Fumo ("A Thread of Smoke") in 1980. Neither of these works enjoyed any significant amount of popularity.

In 1992, after a long pause of 12 years, Camilleri once more took up novel writing. A new book, La Stagione della Caccia ("The Hunting Season") became a best-seller.

In 1994 Camilleri published La forma dell'Acqua (The Shape of Water), the first in a long series of novels featuring Inspector Salvo Montalbano, a fractious detective in the police force of Vigàta, an imaginary Sicilian town. The series is written in Italian but with a substantial sprinkling of Sicilian phrases and grammar. The name Montalbano is a homage to the Spanish writer Manuel Vázquez Montalbán; the similarities between Montalban's Pepe Carvalho and Camilleri's fictional detective are noteworthy. Both writers make use of their protagonists' gastronomic preferences.

This interesting quirk has become something of a fad among his readership, even in mainland Italy. The TV adaptation of Montalbano's adventures, starring Luca Zingaretti, further increased Camilleri's popularity to such a point that in 2003 Camilleri's home town, Porto Empedocle – on which Vigàta is modelled – took the extraordinary step of changing its official name to that of Porto Empedocle Vigàta, no doubt with an eye to capitalising on the tourism possibilities thrown up by the author's work. On his website, Camilleri refers to the engaging and multi-faceted character of Montalbano as a "serial killer of characters," meaning that he has developed a life of his own and demands great attention from his author, to the detriment of other potential books and characters. Camilleri added that he wrote a Montalbano novel every so often just so that the character would be appeased and allow him to work on other stories.

In 2012, Camilleri's The Potter's Field (translated by Stephen Sartarelli) was announced as the winner of the 2012 Crime Writers' Association International Dagger. The announcement was made on 5 July 2012 at the awards ceremony held at One Birdcage Walk in London.

In his last years Camilleri lived in Rome where he worked as a TV and theatre director. About 10 million copies of his novels have been sold to date and are becoming increasingly popular in the UK (where BBC Four broadcast the Montalbano TV series from mid-2011), Australia and North America.

In addition to the degree of popularity brought him by the novels, Andrea Camilleri became even more of a media icon thanks to the parodies aired on an RAI radio show, where popular comedian, TV host and impressionist Fiorello presents him as a raspy voiced, caustic character, madly in love with cigarettes and smoking, since in Italy, Camilleri was well known for being a heavy smoker of cigarettes. He considered himself a "non-militant atheist".

On 17 June 2019, Camilleri suffered a heart attack. He was admitted to hospital in a critical condition. He died on 17 July 2019. He was buried in the Protestant Cemetery of Rome.

Recognitions
 
 1998 Nino Martoglio International Book Award.
 2003 Grand Officer in the Order of Merit of the Italian Republic (Grande Ufficiale Ordine al Merito della Repubblica Italiana).
 2008 RBA Prize for Crime Writing for La rizzagliata / La muerte de Amalia Sacerdote ("The Death of Amalia Sacerdote"), the world's most lucrative crime fiction prize at €125,000.
 Asteroid 204816 Andreacamilleri, discovered by Italian amateur astronomer Vincenzo Casulli in 2007, was named in his honor. The official  was published by the Minor Planet Center on 5 October 2017.

Honorary degrees
He received a number of honorary degrees from several Italian universities, among which are the IULM University of Milan (2002), the University of Pisa (2005), the University of L'Aquila (2007), and the D'Annunzio University of Chieti–Pescara (2007). In 2012 he received an honorary PhD from the Sapienza University of Rome.

Camilleri also received honorary degrees from University College Dublin on 5 December 2011 and the American University of Rome on 30 October 2013.

Bibliography

Inspector Salvo Montalbano (1994–2020)
(excluding short stories)

Other
(including Montalbano short stories)

Le Arancine di Montalbano (1999) 
Biografia di un figlio cambiato (2000) 
Il birraio di Preston (1995) 
La bolla di componenda (1993)
La concessione del telefono (1998) 
La concessione del telefono: versione teatrale dell'omonimo romanzo (2005) 
Il corso delle cose (1978; revised edition, 1998) 
Il diavolo: tentatore, innamorato (2005) 
Favole del tramonto (2000) 
Un filo di fumo (1980)
Il gioco della mosca (1995) 
Gocce di Sicilia (2001)  (Texts originally published in the Almanacco dell'Altana between 1995 and 2000.)
Le inchieste del commissario Collura (2002) 
La linea della palma: Saverio Lodato fa raccontare Andrea Camilleri (2002) 
Il medaglione (2005) 
Un mese con Montalbano (1998)  (Thirty short stories)
Montalbano a viva voce (2002)  (Two audio CDs)
La mossa del cavallo (1999) 
L'ombrello di Noe (2002) 
Le parole raccontate: piccolo dizionario dei termini teatrali (2001) 
 La paura di Montalbano (2002)  (Six short stories)
The Fourth Secret (2014), a short story taken from La paura di Montalbano
La Pensione Eva: romanzo (2006) 
La presa di Macallè (2003)  (Novel in the dialect of Sicily)
La prima indagine di Montalbano (2004) 
Privo di titolo (2005) 
Racconti quotidiani (2001) 
Il re di Girgenti (2001) 
Romanzi storici e civili (2004) 
La scomparsa di Patò: romanzo (2000) 
Hunting Season (2014) La stagione della caccia (1992, 1998) 
Storie di Montalbano (2002) 
La strage dimenticata (1997) 
I teatri stabili in Italia (1898–1918) (1959)
Teatro (2003)
La testa ci fa dire: dialogo con Andrea Camilleri (2000) 
Vi racconto Montalbano: interviste (2006) 
Il colore del sole (2007)
Le pecore ed il pastore (2007)
La novella di Antonello da Palermo (2007)
Voi non sapete (2007)
Maruzza Musumeci (2007)
Il tailleur grigio (2008)
Il casellante (2008)
La muerte de Amalia Sacerdote (2008), La muerte de Amalia Sacerdote (Spanish) 
Un sabato, con gli amici (2009)
Il sonaglio (2009)
La rizzagliata (2009)
La tana delle vipere (2009)
Il nipote del Negus (2010) 
L'intermittenza (2010) 
The Revolution of the Moon (2017) La rivoluzione della luna (2013) 
Noli me tangere (2016) 
Ora dimmi di te (2018) , Háblame de ti. Carta a Matilda (Spanish)

References

External links

  
  Andrea Camilleri: a life in writing
  From Montelusa to Vigata. On the trail of Andrea Camilleri and Inspector Montalbano
  Andrea Camilleri Reader Website (in German, English, and Italian)
  Vigata.org – Camilleri Fans Club
 
 
Judges by Andrea Camilleri, Carlo Lucarelli, Giancarlo De Cataldo - Book Review at Upcoming4.me

 
1925 births
2019 deaths
People from Porto Empedocle
20th-century Italian novelists
21st-century Italian novelists
Writers from the Province of Agrigento
Italian mystery writers
Italian crime fiction writers
Organized crime novelists
Bancarella Prize winners
Accademia Nazionale di Arte Drammatica Silvio D'Amico alumni
Italian male novelists